Gáspár Orbán (born 7 February 1992) is a Hungarian lawyer, soldier, religious leader and former professional footballer. He is the son of Hungarian Prime Minister Viktor Orbán.

Football career
Orbán played as a midfielder for Videoton II and Puskás Akadémia.

Religious career
Orbán was raised as a Catholic alongside his four sisters  In 2014, following a religious epiphany, he converted to the Faith Church, a Pentecostal denomination, where he became a pastor; he claims to have heard from God and witnessed miraculous healings.

Military career
In 2019, Orbán became a professional soldier. In 2020, he went to the Royal Military Academy Sandhurst with a study agreement with the Hungarian state and graduated in January 2021. He undertook five years of military service in exchange.

References

 
 
 

1992 births
Living people
Footballers from Budapest
Hungarian footballers
Fehérvár FC players
Puskás Akadémia FC players
Nemzeti Bajnokság II players
Nemzeti Bajnokság I players
Association football midfielders
Children of prime ministers of Hungary
Hungarian Pentecostals
Pentecostal pastors
Viktor Orbán